The 6th Cinemalaya Independent Film Festival was held from the 9th of July, 2010 until the 18th of July, 2010 in Metro Manila, Philippines.

Overview

The 6th Cinemalaya Independent Film Festival and Competition held in Metro Manila was hosted jointly by Cinemalaya Foundation, Cultural Center of the Philippines (CCP), Film Development Council of the Philippines (FDCP) and Econolink Investments. The film entries were categorized as full-length feature and short films.

The prize money and awards included ₱200,000 and the Balanghai Trophy for the outstanding full feature film and ₱100,000 and a Balanghai Trophy for the best short film. The best director category carried a purse of ₱300,000 and the Balanghai Trophy.

Films directed by big names like Mario O"Hara's Ang Paglilitis ni Bonifacio, Mark Meily's Donor, Joselito Altarejos's  Pink Halo-Halo, Joel Lamangan's Sigwa and Gil Portes's Two Funerals participated in the festival. Films by Filipino directors having directed three full-length commercial feature films also took part as strong contenders.

Entries
The winning film is highlighted with boldface and a dagger.

Directors Showcase
The following films contending for 2010 Directors Showcase. The Directors' Showcase sidebar is for directors who had presented commercially released films in their career.

New Breed
The following films contending for 2010 New Breed category. The New Breed section is for young and new talented filmmakers who will present their first feature film or directors who haven't presented commercially released films in their career.

Short films

Awards

Full-Length Features
Directors Showcase
 Best Film - Donor by Mark Meily
 Special Jury Prize - Two Funerals by Gil Portes
 Audience Award - Two Funerals by Gil Portes
 Best Direction - Gil Portes for Two Funerals
 Best Actor - Baron Geisler for Donor
 Best Actress - Meryll Soriano for Donor
 Best Supporting Actor - Tirso Cruz III for Sigwa
 Best Supporting Actress - Karla Pambid for Donor
 Best Screenplay - Enrique Ramos for Two Funerals
 Best Cinematography - Arvin Viola for Two Funerals
 Best Editing - Chuck Gutierrez for Pink Halo-Halo
 Best Production Design - Aped Santos for Donor

New Breed 
 Best Film - Halaw by Sheron Dayoc
 Special Jury Prize - Sampaguita, National Flower by Francis Xavier Pasion
 Audience Award - Magkakapatid by Kim Garcia
 Best Direction - Sheron Dayoc for Halaw
 Best Actor - John Arcilla for Halaw
 Best Actress - Lovi Poe for Mayohan
 Best Supporting Actor - Emilio Garcia for Rekrut
 Best Supporting Actress - LJ Reyes for The Leaving
 Best Screenplay - Paul Sta. Ana for Mayohan
 Best Cinematography - Dan Villegas for Mayohan and Rommel Sales for The Leaving 
 Best Editing -  Chuck Gutierrez, Lester Olayer for Halaw
 Best Sound - Albert Michael Idioma for Rekrut
 Best Original Music Score - Emerzon Texon for Mayohan

Special Award
 NETPAC Award - Sheika by Arnel Mardoquio

Short films
 Best Short Film - Wag Kang Titingin by Pamela Miras
 Special Jury Prize - P by Rommel Tolentino
 Audience Award - P by Rommel Tolentino
 Best Direction - Rommel Tolentino for P
 Best Screenplay - Mikhail Red for The Barriers

References

External links
Cinemalaya Independent Film Festival

Cinemalaya Independent Film Festival
Cine
Cine
2010 in Philippine cinema